Bohai Shipbuilding Heavy Industry Co., Ltd. (BSHIC), the former Bohai Shipyard, is a shipyard in China. It is a subsidiary of China Shipbuilding Industry Corporation (CSIC), and is located at the Huludao Port, in southwestern Liaoning Province, China, on the northern coast of the Bohai Sea. The company was founded in 1954, and constructed vessels for the Chinese market, expanding in the 1990s to international markets after obtaining ISO 9000 certification. It was briefly part of the Liaoning Shipbuilding Group in the late 1990s before the formations of CSIC.

Bohai Shipyard has produced both civilian and military vessels. It has been particularly instrumental in China's nuclear powered submarine program, constructing the Type 091, the Type 092, the Type 093, and the Type 094. This shipyard also build 4 large bulk carrier, part of Valemax, delivered to Berge Bulk between 2011 - 2013.

In late 2016, Bohai completed a new  covered shipbuilding facility, leading defense industry analysts to speculate that it could be used to increase the submarine production.  It will be able to accommodate the construction of four submarines at once.

References

External links
 Bohai Shipbuilding Heavy Industry website

Shipbuilding companies of China
Shipyards of China
Companies based in Liaoning
Manufacturing companies established in 1954
Chinese companies established in 1954
Submarine builders